Nakhangal may refer to:

Nakhangal (1973 film), Malayalam film released in 1973
Nakhangal (2013 film), Malayalam film released in 2013